The A.V. Club is an American online newspaper and entertainment website featuring reviews, interviews, and other articles that examine films, music, television, books, games, and other elements of pop-culture media. The A.V. Club was created in 1993 as a supplement to its satirical parent publication, The Onion. While it was a part of The Onions 1996 website launch, The A.V. Club had minimal presence on the website at that point.

A 2005 website redesign placed The A.V. Club in a more prominent position, allowing its online identity to grow. Unlike The Onion, The A.V. Club and other sites owned by G/O Media are not satirical. The publication's name is a reference to audiovisual (AV) clubs typical of American high schools.

History
In 1993, five years after the founding of The Onion, Stephen Thompson, a student at the University of Wisconsin–Madison, launched an entertainment section of the newspaper.

In 1996, both The Onion and The A.V. Club debuted on the Internet. The A.V. Club was originally a subsection of the main theonion.com domain name.

The supplement was moved to its own domain name, theavclub.com, before the 2005 acquisition of the shorter avclub.com domain name. The latter change coincided with a redesign that incorporated reader comments and blog content. In 2006, the website shifted its content model again to add content on a daily, rather than weekly, basis. Some contributors have become established as freelance writers and editors.

In December 2004, Stephen Thompson left his position as founding editor of The A.V. Club.

According to Sean Mills, then-president of The Onion, the A.V. Club website first reached more than 1 million unique visitors in October 2007. In late 2009, the website was reported to have received more than 1.4 million unique visitors and 75,000 comments per month.

At its peak, the print version of The A.V. Club was available in 17 different cities. Localized sections of the website were also maintained, with reviews and news relevant to specific cities. The print version and localized websites were gradually discontinued, and in December 2013, print publication ceased production in the last three markets.

2012–2014 staff departures
On 13 December 2012, long-time writer and editor Keith Phipps, who oversaw the website after Stephen Thompson left, stepped down from his role as editor of The A.V. Club. He said, "Onion, Inc. and I have come to a mutual parting of the ways."

On 2 April 2013, long-time film editor and critic Scott Tobias stepped down as film editor of The A.V. Club. He said via Twitter, "After 15 great years @theavclub, I step down as Film Editor next Friday."

On 26 April 2013, long-time writers Nathan Rabin, Tasha Robinson, and Genevieve Koski announced they would also be leaving the website to begin work on a new project with Scott Tobias and Keith Phipps. Koski also said that she would continue to write freelance articles. Writer Noel Murray announced he would be joining their new project, but would also continue to contribute to The A.V. Club in a reduced capacity. On 30 May 2013, those six writers were announced as becoming part of the senior staff of The Dissolve, a film website run by Pitchfork Media.

In April and June 2014, senior staff writers Kyle Ryan, Sonia Saraiya, and Emily St. James left the website for positions at Entertainment Weekly, Salon, and Vox Media, respectively. In 2015, Ryan returned to Onion, Inc. for a position in development. Following his departure from The Dissolve earlier that month, Nathan Rabin returned to write freelance for the A.V. Club website in May 2015. He renewed his regular column "My World of Flops" . The Dissolve folded in July 2015.

Television series
On 16 February 2017, The A.V. Club's editor-at-large, John Teti, posted an article on the website announcing the upcoming release of a television series, titled The A.V. Club, based on the website. The series, hosted by Teti, began airing on Fusion on 16 March 2017 and ran for one season. The series featured news, criticism, and discussions about various popular-culture topics and featured staff members from the website.

Move to Univision, then G/O Media
In January 2016, Univision Communications acquired "a 40 percent, controlling stake" in Onion Inc., the parent company of The A.V. Club. Later that year, Univision also purchased Gawker Media and reorganized several of Gawker's sites into the new Gizmodo Media Group, a division of Fusion Media Group.

In November 2017, due to the community's expanding membership and an increasing volume of original content, The A.V. Club offshoot website After Dark was switched from Disqus to a separate WordPress site and re-branded The Avocado. The site was subsequently migrated from Bulbs, an internal content management system developed by Onion Inc. to the Gawker-developed Kinja platform. It deleted the comment section and audience reviews hosted on the previous site. In July 2018, Univision announced it was looking for a buyer for the entire Gizmodo Group.

In April 2019, Gizmodo and The Onion were sold to private-equity firm Great Hill Partners, which combined them into a new company named G/O Media. In July 2019, executive editor Laura M. Browning and managing editor Caitlin PenzeyMoog left. In early 2020, former People magazine and Entertainment Weekly editor Patrick Gomez was named editor-in-chief, and it was announced that the site was opening a Los Angeles bureau. In August 2021, Yahoo! Entertainment and E! Online alum Scott Robson joined to lead the team.

Onion Inc. Union 
In March 2018 the employees of the company announced they had unionized with the Writers Guild Of America, East. The union comprises "all of the creative staffs at Onion Inc.: The A.V. Club, The Onion, ClickHole, The Takeout, Onion Labs, and Onion Inc.'s video and art departments." (ClickHole was subsequently acquired by Cards Against Humanity in February 2020.) The union was recognized on 20 April 2018 and reached a contract agreement with management on 20 December 2018. The contract includes "annual pay increases, minimum pay grades, strong diversity and anti-harassment language, just cause, union security, editorial independence, intellectual property rights, and an end to permalancers."

2022 closure of Chicago office and staff departures 
On 18 January 2022, the union representing staff at the website announced that all seven staff members based in Chicago had taken severance as opposed to accepting a mandatory move of work location to Los Angeles. This predominantly affected the senior staff of the site and comprised the managing editor, film editor, TV editor, associate editor, senior writer, assistant editor, and editorial coordinator.

Controversy 
On 9 December 2010, the website ComicsComicsMag revealed a capsule review for the book Genius, Isolated: The Life and Art of Alex Toth had been fabricated. The book had not yet been published nor even completed by the authors. After the review was removed, editor Keith Phipps posted an apology on the website, stating that the reporter assigned the review could not locate a copy of the book ("for obvious reasons"), so fabricated it. Leonard Pierce, the author of the review, was terminated from his freelance role with the website.

Books

Awards
In 2017, The A.V. Club won an Eisner Award for "Best Comics-related Periodical/Journalism" (for works published in 2016). The award went to writers Oliver Sava, Caitlin Rosberg, Shea Hennum, and Tegan O'Neil. The award also went to editor Caitlin PenzeyMoog.

A.V. Club year- and decade-end lists
Starting in 1999, only lists written by individual writers were published. Beginning in 2006, The A.V. Club began publishing website-consensus, year-end album and film rankings, together with lists created by individual writers. Additionally decade-end lists were published for the 2000s and 2010s.

Annual rankings for television began in 2010.

Album of the Year

Film of the Year

Television Show of the Year

References

External links

The Onion
Mass media in Chicago
Publications established in 1993
American review websites
Online newspapers with defunct print editions